Sean Cornelius Johnson (born September 9), is an American Christian R&B and Christian hip hop musician. He started making music in 2005, releasing five studio albums, Simply a Vessel (2006), Simply a Vessel, Vol 2: Faithful (2009), Simply a Vessel, Vol 3: Surrender All (2012), Circa 1993 (2015) and Race the Sun (2016), while releasing two extended plays, Joy (2011) and Grateful (2013).

Early life
Johnson was born Sean Cornelius Johnson on September 9 to a military father in the United States Air Force and his mother Althea Johnson. The family would move often with stops in Germany, Philadelphia, Kentucky, and Clarksville, Tennessee because of his fathers job. His mother died on February 7, 1993, when he was at the age of eleven.

Music career
His music record career began in 2005, with his first release, Simply a Vessel, a studio album, that was released in January 2006. The next release, Simply a Vessel, Vol 2: Faithful, another studio album, was released in 2009. He released, Joy, an extended play, in 2011. His third studio album, Simply a Vessel, Vol. 3: Surrender All, was released in 2012. The second extended play, Grateful, was released in 2013. He released, Circa 1993, another studio album, in 2015. His fifth studio album/EP, Race the Sun was released in 2016, consisting of a compilation of different tracks.

Personal life
He resides in Del City, Oklahoma.

Discography
Studio albums
 Simply a Vessel (2006)
 Simply a Vessel, Vol 2: Faithful (2009)
 Simply a Vessel, Vol 3: Surrender All (2012)
 Circa 1993 (2015)
 Race the Sun (2016)
Days Like This (2018)

EPs
 Joy (2011)
 Grateful (2013).

References

External links
 

Living people
American performers of Christian hip hop music
Musicians from Oklahoma
Musicians from Pennsylvania
Musicians from Tennessee
Place of birth missing (living people)
Rappers from Pennsylvania
Rappers from Tennessee
21st-century American rappers
Year of birth missing (living people)